Delft is a city in the Netherlands.

Delft may also refer to:

Other places
 Delft, Western Cape, a township in South Africa
 Neduntheevu, an island in Sri Lanka
 Delft Island fort, in Sri Lanka
 Delft University of Technology, a Dutch public university
 Delft, Minnesota, United States
 Delft Colony, California, United States

Other uses
 Delft jewelry
 Delft pottery
 Dutch ship Delft, several ships in the Dutch Navy
 Battle of Delft, a battle during the Sri Lankan Civil War

See also 
 Delft School (disambiguation), in the arts
 Deft (disambiguation)